

359001–359100 

|-bgcolor=#f2f2f2
| colspan=4 align=center | 
|}

359101–359200 

|-id=103
| 359103 Ottopiene || 2009 BS || Otto Piene (1928–2014), a German artist, visionary and teacher who co-founded the ZERO group, directed MIT's Center for Advanced Visual Studies and coined the term "Sky Art". || 
|}

359201–359300 

|-bgcolor=#f2f2f2
| colspan=4 align=center | 
|}

359301–359400 

|-bgcolor=#f2f2f2
| colspan=4 align=center | 
|}

359401–359500 

|-id=426
| 359426 Lacks ||  || Henrietta Lacks (1920–1951) was an American woman whose cancer cells, taken without her knowledge, became one of the most important tools in medicine. Her cells were used to develop the polio vaccine and other medical advances. Her story serves as a powerful symbol of the importance of informed consent in science. || 
|}

359501–359600 

|-bgcolor=#f2f2f2
| colspan=4 align=center | 
|}

359601–359700 

|-bgcolor=#f2f2f2
| colspan=4 align=center | 
|}

359701–359800 

|-bgcolor=#f2f2f2
| colspan=4 align=center | 
|}

359801–359900 

|-bgcolor=#f2f2f2
| colspan=4 align=center | 
|}

359901–360000 

|-bgcolor=#f2f2f2
| colspan=4 align=center | 
|}

References 

359001-360000